McAlister Field House is a 6,000-seat multi-purpose arena on the campus of The Citadel in Charleston, South Carolina, United States. It was built in 1939 and is home to The Citadel Bulldogs basketball, wrestling and volleyball teams.  Office space in the facility houses athletic department staff as well as several coaches.

Previously known as The Citadel Armory, the facility was named in honor of Col. David S. McAlister, Citadel Class of 1924 on March 16, 1973.

The arena was renovated in 1989, and is used for entertainment events including concerts and sporting events, as well as college and high school commencements. The renovation expanded the seating capacity from 4,500 to 6,000. The facility has hosted several athletic tournaments, including opening rounds of the Southern Conference women's basketball tournament and the All-Academy Wrestling Championship.

On July 23, 2007, McAlister Field House was the venue for the Democratic Party's edition of the CNN-YouTube presidential debates.  McAlister is also used as the venue for major speeches and addresses to the Corps of Cadets, including President George W. Bush's December 11, 2001 address.

See also
 List of NCAA Division I basketball arenas

References

External links
McAlister Field House - The Citadel

The Citadel Bulldogs basketball
The Citadel Bulldogs women's volleyball
The Citadel Bulldogs wrestling
The Citadel Bulldogs sports venues
College basketball venues in the United States
Basketball venues in South Carolina
Sports venues in Charleston, South Carolina
1939 establishments in South Carolina
Sports venues completed in 1939
College volleyball venues in the United States
College wrestling venues in the United States